Gabriel Jeremiah Adedayo A. Osho (born 14 August 1998) is an English professional footballer who plays as a defender and midfielder for Luton Town.

Early life and education
Born in Reading, Osho attended Leighton Park School in Reading and The Forest School in Winnersh.

Career

Reading
In July 2016, Osho signed his first professional deal with Reading, signing a new deal until the summer of 2020 on 3 January 2018. 
Osho became the 49th graduate from Reading Academy when he made his debut in a 0–1 defeat to Middlesbrough on 22 December 2018 earning man of the match.

On 29 January 2019, Osho joined Bristol Rovers on loan for the remainder of the 2018/19 season.

On 28 October 2019, Osho featured on trial for Ipswich Town U23's in their game against Coventry City.

On 7 December 2019, Osho joined National League side Yeovil Town on loan until 4 January 2020.

With his contract with Reading due to expire on 30 June 2020, and due to the effects of the COVID-19 pandemic on the 2019–20 season, Osho signed a short-term extension with Reading until the end of the season on 26 June 2020. Following the completion of the 2019–20 season, Osho was offered a new contract by Reading, but went on to decline the offer and leave the club.

In October 2020, he played for Salford City's development squad in a Central League match.

Luton Town
On 18 November 2020, Osho joined EFL Championship side Luton Town on a permanent deal. In December 2020, Osho rejoined National League side Yeovil Town on a one month loan deal.

On 21 January 2021, Osho joined Rochdale on loan until the end of the season.

Personal life
Born in England, Osho is of Nigerian descent.

Career statistics

References

External links
Profile at the Luton Town F.C. website

1998 births
Living people
English footballers
Sportspeople from Reading, Berkshire
Association football defenders
Reading F.C. players
Maidenhead United F.C. players
Aldershot Town F.C. players
Bristol Rovers F.C. players
Yeovil Town F.C. players
Luton Town F.C. players
Rochdale A.F.C. players
English Football League players
National League (English football) players
Black British sportspeople
English people of Nigerian descent
Footballers from Berkshire